Pascale Baeriswyl (born, 1968 Bern) is a Swiss judge, diplomat and a politician of the Social Democratic Party (SP). She was the first woman State Secretary of State of the Swiss Federal Department of Foreign Affairs (EDA), the current Ambassador to the United Nations (UN) and in June 2022 she was elected the Swiss representative to the Security Council of the United Nations.

Education and early life 
Having studied in the Universities of Geneva, Basel and the Sorbonne in Paris , she graduated with a masters in public and private law and a masters in linguistics French literature and history from the University of Basel. After graduating, she was a judge at the civil court in Basel for seven years and worked as a researcher at the Swiss National Science Foundation.

Diplomatic career 
Baeriswyl entered in service of the Federal Department of Foreign Affairs (EDA) in 2000. In 2001 she served in the Swiss Embassy to Vietnam in Hanoi, where she was involved in the Directory of International Law until 2005. Between 2005 and 2008 she served in the Embassy to the European Union in Brussels. Between 2008 and 2013 she led the political department of the Embassy to the United Nations with a focus on the Security Council of the United Nations. In 2013 she was granted the title Ambassador.

Secretary of State of the Federal Department of Foreign Affairs 
On appointment by the Federal Councilor Didier Burkhalter, she became the first woman  of the EDA in 2016. In this function she led the negotiations with the European Union since April 2017. After Ignazio Cassis assumed as the successor of Burkhalter, she was relieved from her duties in the negotiations with the EU, but stayed Secretary of State. As Secretary of State she was the highest ranking diplomat and responsible for the strategic development of the foreign policy and in charge of the 120 Swiss diplomatic missions throughout the world. In September 2019 she was appointed the Swiss Representative to the United Nations.

Representative to the United Nations 
After on 9 June 2022 Switzerland was elected into the Security Council of the United Nations she became the first diplomat to represent Switzerland in the Security Council.

Political career 
She is a member of the Social Democratic Party of Basel Stadt and in 2019 was considered a successor of Eva Herzog in the Executive Council of Canton Basel Stadt. She declined and Tanja Soland became Herzog's successor instead.

References 

1968 births
Living people
Swiss women judges
Swiss women diplomats
University of Basel alumni
Permanent Representatives of Switzerland to the United Nations